Martin Conlon (1879 – 23 January 1966) was an Irish politician. He was elected to Dáil Éireann as a Cumann na nGaedheal Teachta Dála (TD) for the Roscommon constituency at the 1925 by-election caused by the resignation of Henry Finlay of Cumann na nGaedheal. He was re-elected at the June 1927, September 1927 and 1932 general elections. 

He lost his Dáil seat at the 1933 general election. He was elected to the 3rd Seanad in 1938 on the Industrial and Commercial Panel. He was defeated at the 1943 Seanad election.

References

1879 births
1966 deaths
Cumann na nGaedheal TDs
Members of the 4th Dáil
Members of the 5th Dáil
Members of the 6th Dáil
Members of the 7th Dáil
Members of the 3rd Seanad
Politicians from County Roscommon
Place of death missing
Fine Gael senators